Charles Fort (1874–1932) was an American writer.

Charles Fort may also refer to:

 Charles Fort (poet) (born 1951), American poet
 Charles Fort (Ireland), military fort near Kinsale in Ireland
 Charlesfort, or Charles Fort, a 16th-century French settlement on Parris Island in what is now South Carolina
 Port-Royal (Acadia), originally a 1629 Scottish settlement named Charles Fort, now Charles Fort National Historic Site in Annapolis Royal, Nova Scotia, Canada

See also
Fort Charles (disambiguation)
Charles Forte, Baron Forte (1908–2007), hotelier

Fort, Charles